The following is a partial list of parks in Montreal, Quebec Canada.

Large parks
Eight of the parks are considered nature parks. The "Network of Large Parks" consists of precious natural areas recognized for their biodiversity and beauty. Some of the large parks also contain historic homes acquired by the City of Montreal.

 Angrignon Park 
 Des Rapides Park
 Dieppe Park
 Frédéric-Back Park
 Jarry Park
 Jeanne-Mance Park
 Jean Drapeau Park
 La Fontaine Park
 Maisonneuve Park
 Mount Royal Park
 Promenade Bellerive Park
 René Lévesque Park
 Tiohtià:ke Otsira’kéhne Park (Outremont Summit)

Nature parks

 L'Anse-à-l'Orme Nature Park
 Cap-Saint-Jacques Nature Park
 Bois-de-l'Île-Bizard Nature Park
 Bois-de-Liesse Nature Park
 Bois-de-Saraguay Nature Park
 L'Île-de-la-Visitation Nature Park
 Pointe-aux-Prairies Nature Park
 Ruisseau-De Montigny Nature Park

The City of Montreal has a plan to combine several of the nature parks, as well as a couple of other parks, into the Grand Parc de L’Ouest.

Other major parks

 Ahuntsic Park
 Athena Park
 Dante Park
 
 
 Marguerite Bourgeoys Park
 Olympic Park
 Oxford Park (Georges-Saint-Pierre Park)
 Rapides du Cheval Blanc Park
 Riverside Park
 Rutherford Park
 Sir Wilfrid Laurier Park

Urban squares

The following is a partial list of urban squares in Montreal.

 Cabot Square
 Chaboillez Square
 Champ de Mars
 Dorchester Square
 Le Parterre
 Peace Park
 Place d'Armes
 Place des Arts
 
 Place du Canada
 Place d'Youville
 Place Émilie-Gamelin
 Place Jacques-Cartier
 Place Jean-Paul Riopelle
 Phillips Square
 Saint Henri Square (Saint Henri Park)
 Sir George-Étienne Cartier Square

 Saint-Louis Square
 Sun Yat-sen Park
 Victoria Square
 Vauquelin Square
 Viger Square

Protected areas

Amusement parks
 Belmont Park (1923-1983)
 Dominion Park (1906-1937)
 Six Flags: La Ronde

References

External links
 Montreal official website, ville.montreal.qc.ca; accessed 26 March 2017.

Montreal
Parks
Montreal

Grands parcs de Montréal